St James is a town in northern Victoria, Australia.

The town of St James came into being as a result of selectors taking up land in the district. The first selection of land in the St James area was thought to be in 1870.

St James was the location of the first business of G.J Coles, founder of the Coles Group.

The town is located the Oaklands railway line that continues to Yarrawonga and across the border to Oaklands in New South Wales.

St James Post Office opened on 10 July 1899.

Former Carlton Football Club premiership captain, James "Jim" Flynn played for many years with the St. James Football Club before and after his playing days in the Victorian Football League. Jim was still playing football with the St. James Football Club in his early 40s and was a member of the St. James Football Club 1911 and 1913 premiership teams.

Golfers play at the course of the St James Golf Club.

References

External links 

Travelmate – Tourism site

Towns in Victoria (Australia)
Shire of Moira